An annular solar eclipse will occur on Saturday, June 1, 2030. A solar eclipse occurs when the Moon passes between Earth and the Sun, thereby totally or partly obscuring the image of the Sun for a viewer on Earth. An annular solar eclipse occurs when the Moon's apparent diameter is smaller than the Sun's, blocking most of the Sun's light and causing the Sun to look like an annulus (ring). An annular eclipse appears as a partial eclipse over a region of the Earth thousands of kilometres wide.

An annular eclipse will start on the north of Africa and will cross Eurasian continent, will cross Algeria, Tunisia, Libya, Malta, Greece, Turkey, Bulgaria, Ukraine, Russia, Kazakhstan, China and Japan. An eclipse will pass through lot of large cities such as Tripoli, Athens, Istanbul, Krasnodar, Rostov-on-Don, Volgograd, Omsk, Krasnoyarsk and Sapporo.

Images 
Animated path

Related eclipses

Solar eclipses 2029–2032

Saros 128

Metonic series

References

External links 
 NASA graphics

2030 6 1
2030 in science
2030 06 01
2030 06 01